The chestnut capuchin or chestnut weeper capuchin (Cebus castaneus) is a species of capuchin monkey from northeastern Brazil, southern Guyana, Suriname, and French Guiana.

Taxonomy 
It was described in 1851 as a subspecies of the wedge-capped capuchin (C. olivaceus). However, a 2012 study found grounds to at least tentatively recognize it as a distinct species. The American Society of Mammalogists, IUCN Red List, and ITIS all follow this classification.

Distribution 
It is found in northeastern Brazil, southern Guyana, and most of Suriname and French Guiana. It inhabits the uplands of the Guiana Shield north of the Amazon River, east of the Rio Negro, limited on both sides by the Branco River, and from here ranges north, east of the Orinoco and Ventuari rivers, to Guyana. Its range still remains poorly known.

References 

chestnut capuchin
Mammals of Brazil
Mammals of French Guiana
Mammals of Guyana
Mammals of Suriname
chestnut capuchin
chestnut capuchin
Primates of South America